The 2016 ITF Women's Circuit – Shenzhen was a professional tennis tournament played on outdoor hard courts. It was the second edition of the tournament and part of the 2016 ITF Women's Circuit, offering a total of $50,000 in prize money. It took place in Shenzhen, China, on 11–17 April 2016.

Singles main draw entrants

Seeds 

 1 Rankings as of 4 April 2016.

Other entrants 
The following players received wildcards into the singles main draw:
  Liang Chen
  Peng Shuai
  Zhang Yukun
  Zheng Wushuang

The following players received entry from the qualifying draw:
  Hsu Chieh-yu
  Dalila Jakupović
  Jessica Pieri
  Sun Xuliu

The following player received entry by a lucky loser:
  Shuko Aoyama

The following player received entry by a protected ranking:
  Miharu Imanishi

The following player received entry by a junior exempt:
  Katie Swan

Champions

Singles

 Wang Qiang def.  Mayo Hibi, 6–2, 6–0

Doubles

 Shuko Aoyama /  Makoto Ninomiya def.  Liang Chen /  Wang Yafan, 7–6(7–5), 6–4

External links 
 2016 ITF Women's Circuit – Shenzhen at ITFtennis.com

2016
2016 ITF Women's Circuit
2016 in Chinese tennis